Irwin County High School is a public high school located in Ocilla, Georgia, United States. It serves grades 9 through 12. Around 450 students currently attend Irwin County High School as of the 2011-2012 school year.

Irwin County High School is governed by the Irwin County School District and is accredited by the Southern Association for Secondary Schools and Colleges, as well as the Georgia DOE.

The Irwin County High School marching band attended and played at the 2011 Sugar Bowl in New Orleans.

Demographics 

In the 2011-2012 school year, 433 students attended Irwin County High School.  49% were male and 51% were female. 65% of students at ICHS were white/Caucasian, 31% were African-American, 0.02% were Asian, 0% were Hawaiian/Pacific Islander, 3% were Hispanic, and 1% were two or more races. 35% of students were considered to be a part of a minority. 66% of students were considered economically disadvantaged, with 54% receiving free lunches and 12% receiving reduced lunches. For the 2011-2012 school year, there were 136 ninth-grade students, 101 tenth-grade students, 109 eleventh-grade students, and 87 twelfth-grade students.

Campus and building 
Irwin County High School's present-day campus shares a location and building with Irwin County Middle School and the alternative education school, and opened for the 1995-96 school year. It was designed and constructed by Smith & Smith Architects. The main building consists of seven main hallways containing the library, cafeteria, gym, chorus and band rooms, and multiple technology labs.

Around 2000, due to an increase in the student body, a need for additional classrooms was identified.  Six classrooms, two and two bathrooms were added. The library's size was increased by about fifty percent.

The campus  has livestock holding and showing facilities, a 570-seat auditorium, greenhouses, tool shops, and a football stadium with a field house and track facilities.

Curriculum 

Irwin County High School follows the national CORE curriculum set of standards. It also offers business education, Spanish, library sciences, journalism, and show choir courses.

Extracurricular activities 

Irwin County High School offers a variety of school clubs and student organizations. Clubs include the school newspaper, Technology Student Association, Future Business Leaders of America, FCCLA, Future Educators of America, Future Farmers of America, One Club, and Spanish Club.

Notable alumni 

 Justin Anderson - offensive lineman for the Indianapolis Colts
 Dre Barnes - running back for Liberty University
 Dennis Dove - pitcher for the St. Louis Cardinals
 Bruce Dorminey - Forbes journalist
 Jack Smith - football player
 Walt H. Sumner - outfielder and defensive back for Florida State University

References

External links 

Public high schools in Georgia (U.S. state)
Schools in Irwin County, Georgia